Melvine Marie Ericka Malard (born 28 June 2000) is a French professional footballer who plays as a forward for Division 1 Féminine club Lyon and the France national team.

Career 
Malard started playing football in Saint-Denis FC, on her native island of Réunion. She joined the Olympique Lyonnais in 2014, signing her first professional contract in July 2017 with the European champions.

For the 2019–20 season, she was sent on loan to FC Fleury 91 to gain some game-time, Which did not prevent her from joining back Lyon for the Uefa Champions League Final, taking part in the victory as a substitute.

On 18 September 2020, Malard made her debut for the France national team in a 2–0 victory against Serbia.

In January 2020, she was named by UEFA as one of the ten most promising young players in Europe

Career statistics

International

Scores and results list France's goal tally first, score column indicates score after each Malard goal.

Honours
Lyon 
Division 1 Féminine: 2018–19, 2021–22
UEFA Women's Champions League: 2017–18, 2018–19, 2019–20, 2021–22

France U19
Euro Under-19: 2019

References

External links
 
 
 

2000 births
Living people
French women's footballers
Women's association football forwards
Olympique Lyonnais Féminin players
Division 1 Féminine players
France women's youth international footballers
France women's international footballers
Black French sportspeople
Sportspeople from Saint-Denis, Réunion
Women's footballers from Réunion
FC Fleury 91 (women) players
UEFA Women's Euro 2022 players